Darkey Springs is an unincorporated community in White County, Tennessee, in the United States.

History
According to one source, the community was named on account of the slave market that it once contained in the 1820s.

A post office was established at Darkey Springs in 1871, and remained in operation until it was discontinued in 1904.

References

Unincorporated communities in White County, Tennessee
Unincorporated communities in Tennessee